Wisdom is a small town in Beaverhead County, Montana, United States. The population was 98 at the 2010 census. The ZIP Code of the area is 59761.  The town includes three tourist lodgings, service station, grocery, school (K-8), post office and a Forest Service office.

History
Wisdom was named for the Wisdom River, which is now named the Big Hole River, that passes through the town. The post office opened in 1884.

Geography
Wisdom is located at  (45.616120, -113.449742).

Wisdom is located along Montana Highway 43. Tweedy Mountain is nearby as is West Goat Peak.

Climate
Wisdom, owing to its high altitude and northerly location, has a subalpine climate (Köppen Dfc) with long, cold, dry winters and short summers with very warm afternoons and cold, clear mornings. With over 277 mornings each year below freezing and only July ever completely frost-free, Wisdom is in terms of frequency of frost one of the coldest places in the United States. During major cold waves, Wisdom’s location in an enclosed valley can make for exceptionally cold temperatures:  was reached during a great cold wave on December 23, 1983, and  has been reached during seven years, though not since February 4, 1989.

Minimum temperatures during spring do not typically stay above freezing until well into June, although the average last spring ice day date is April 1 and the first fall ice day November 1. Snow cover is usually gone by the end of March, and despite occasional light snowfalls in May, snow on the ground in that month has not been recorded since 1953.

On average only two mornings remain above  each summer, and Wisdom has never recorded so high a minimum between October 20 and May 4 inclusive. By the end of August mornings fall to freezing in five-eighths of all years, and in seven-eighths by the end of September, with the weather continuing to cool into winter with the first minimum under zero expected on November 10.

Demographics

2000 Census data
As of the 2000 census, there were 114 people, 61 households, and 32 families residing in the CDP. The population density was 120.0 people per square mile (46.3/km). There were 88 housing units at an average density of 92.7 per square mile (35.8/km). The racial makeup of the CDP was 96.49% White, 1.75% Native American, 1.75% from other races. Hispanic or Latino of any race were 1.75% of the population.

There were 61 households, out of which 11.5% had children under the age of 18 living with them, 47.5% were married couples living together, 1.6% had a female householder with no husband present, and 47.5% were non-families. It is unknown how many male householders with no wife present existed. 41.0% of all households were made up of individuals, and 11.5% had someone living alone who was 65 years of age or older. The average household size was 1.85 and the average family size was 2.47.

In the CDP, the population dispersal was 12.3% under the age of 18, 4.4% from 18 to 24, 28.9% from 25 to 44, 43.0% from 45 to 64, and 11.4% who were 65 years of age or older. The median age was 49 years. For every 100 females, there were 103.6 males. For every 100 females age 18 and over, there were 122.2 males. The median income for a household in the CDP was $24,583, and the median income for a family was $41,875. Males had a median income of $27,500 versus $21,406 for females. The per capita income for the CDP was $18,172. There were 11.1% of families and 12.9% of the population living below the poverty line, including no under eighteens and 33.3% of those over 64.

Education
Wisdom schools provides education from kindergarten through 8th grade. In 2021, 7 students were enrolled.

References

External links

 Wisdom, Montana information from Americantowns.com

Census-designated places in Beaverhead County, Montana
Census-designated places in Montana